Stylospania is a genus of snipe flies of the family Rhagionidae. The genus is based on one single male specimen collected from Samar in the Philippines. It bears most of the features found in Chrysopilus, but with its stylate flagellum. The female of the genus is completely  unknown. Stylospania lancifera is a delicate little fly of 4.5 mm.

Distribution
Philippines.

Species
S. lancifera Frey, 1954

References

Rhagionidae
Brachycera genera
Diptera of Asia
Monotypic Brachycera genera
Taxa named by Richard Karl Hjalmar Frey
Endemic fauna of the Philippines